The Center for Advanced Materials (CAM) is a research center at Qatar University that hosts faculty members and researchers involved in advanced materials research. It provides the opportunities for collaborative research projects between academic and industry experts as well between faculty members and students. The Center for Advanced Materials works under Qatar University's Office of Vice President for Research and Graduate Studies. The Center continues to expand its research profile both nationally and internationally through the establishment of a variety of research programs. In order to facilitate this type of high-profile research, its facilities, are constantly upgraded with the installation of major new equipment having the latest technology. It intends to have brighter, border-less innovations in the fields of Material Science and Engineering to help build a sustainable society in accordance with Qatar National Vision 2030 and to contribute to economic progress by developing advanced materials for new technologies, lowering the cost and enhancing the performance of more established technologies.

The center addresses the problems, challenges, and opportunities facing the state of Qatar's gas processing industry. The center is focused on two main themes which are Asset Management/Process Optimization and Sustainable Development. The services provided by the center have been designed to address the necessities and challenges of both Qatar University and the Qatari Industry. These services include:

Applied Research Projects/Consulting
Professional Training and Seminars
Bi-annual Gas Processing Symposium
Information Management/Library

Research Clusters

CAM's research clusters are, broadly grouped into the following areas:	Metallurgy, Sustainable	 Materials,	Corrosion,	Polymer Materials and Renewable Energy Resources.

UNESCO Chair in Desalination and Water Treatment 
Water security is identified as one of the challenges of Qatar National Vision 2030. To tackle this critical challenge and to better adapt to drought due to climate change, UNESCO established chair in water desalination and water treatment at CAM, Qatar University.

This UNESCO chair is the first of its kind in the Gulf region under UNESCO Chair and UNITWIN programs. The program involves over 850 institutions in 117 countries.

Pioneering Research at CAM 

 Utilizing palm waste to produce value-added products.
 Pioneers Heat Absorbers Technology for Energy Management.
 Develops High-Quality, Low-Cost Battery Packs.
 Research smart self-healing corrosion-protective coatings for oil and gas industry.
  Authors the first book on Reverse Osmosis (RO) Desalination in the Gulf region titled: “Reverse Osmosis Systems: Design, Optimization and Troubleshooting Guide.”

CAM Patents 
1. US2020/0254396 B1: Precise fabrication of activated-hydrophilic-hydrophobic MXenes-based multidimensional nanosystems for efficient and prompt water purification from petroleum wastes and desalination process under ambient conditions.

2. US 2020/0239311 B2: Porous one-dimensional polymeric graphitic carbon nitride-based nanosystems for catalytic conversion of carbon monoxide and carbon dioxide under ambient conditions. 

3. US11045793B1: Controlled on-pot design of mixed copper/zinc oxides supported aluminum oxide as an efficient catalyst for conversion of syngas to heavy liquid hydrocarbons and alcohols under ambient conditions feasible for the Fischer-Tropsch synthesis. 

4. US10786757B2: Compact Electrocoalescer with Conical Frustum Electrodes.

5. US20190050622A1: Biometric liveness detection through the biocompatible capacitive sensor.

6. US20220202519A1: A tactile sensor, a surgical instrument having the same, and a method of manufacturing the same. 

7. US20190184299A1: Smart robotic therapeutic learning toy.

8. US2018/0291166A1: Insulating plastic foams based on polyolefins.

CAM Facilities

The Center for Advanced Materials recently installed unique equipment for the investigation and determination of mechanical properties of materials in dynamic mode.

Accreditation
Environmental Science Center (ESC), Center of Advanced Materials (CAM) and Central Laboratories Unit (CLU) are accredited to International Standard ISO/IEC 17025:2005 (General requirements for the competence of testing and calibration laboratories) by the American Association of Laboratory Accreditation (A2LA).

References

External links 
 Qatar University  
 Qatar University Newsroom
 Center for Advanced Materials
 WISE Initiative

1973 establishments in Qatar
Organisations based in Doha
Research institutes in Qatar
Educational institutions established in 1973
Qatar University
Education by subject
Science education
Learning programs